Ferguson Crossroads (also known as Ferguson) is an unincorporated community in Miller County, Arkansas, United States.

References

Unincorporated communities in Miller County, Arkansas
Unincorporated communities in Arkansas